Arthur R. Smith (November 8, 1805  – September 16, 1865) was a nineteenth-century American doctor and politician from Virginia.

Early life
Smith was born in Suffolk, Virginia. He was educated in local county schools, and received a Medical Doctorate from the University of Virginia in 1825-1826.

Career

As an adult, Smith lived in Norfolk County, Virginia (now Chesapeake) and practiced medicine there at Deep Creek. He attended medical lectures in Philadelphia in 1848.

Smith was elected to the Virginia state Senate, and in 1856 relocated his practice to Portsmouth.

In 1850, Smith was elected to the Virginia Constitutional Convention of 1850. He was one of four delegates elected from the southeastern delegate district made up of his home district of Norfolk County, Norfolk City and Princess Anne County.

Elected to the Virginia Senate for the session 1852/53, Smith was reelected for the 1853/54 session.

Smith was a member of the Democratic National Convention of 1860 at Charleston, South Carolina.  Elected to the  Virginia Secession Convention of 1861, he voted for secession.

During the American Civil War, Smith was banished from Portsmouth by General Benjamin Butler. Smith ran the blockade, and served in Confederate hospitals in Richmond, Virginia and Farmville.

Death
Arthur R. Smith died on September 16, 1865 in Catonsville, Maryland shortly after moving there following his Confederate hospital service.

References

Bibliography

Virginia state senators
1805 births
1865 deaths
Politicians from Suffolk, Virginia
Politicians from Chesapeake, Virginia
Politicians from Portsmouth, Virginia
University of Virginia School of Medicine alumni
19th-century American physicians
Physicians from Virginia
19th-century American politicians